Cooper Flagg (born December 21, 2006) is an American basketball player who currently attends Montverde Academy.

Early life and high school
Flagg grew up in Newport, Maine and initially attended Nokomis Regional High School. He became the first freshman to be named the Maine Gatorade Player of the Year after averaging 20.5 points, 10.0 rebounds, 6.2 assists, 3.7 steals, and 3.7 blocks per game. Nokomis won the Class A state championship with Flagg scoring 22 points and grabbing 16 rebounds in a 43-27 win against Falmouth High School in the state final.

Flagg transferred to Montverde Academy in Montverde, Florida at the end of his freshman year of high school. Prior to the beginning of his first year at the school, he played in the Nike Elite Youth Basketball League for the Florida Eagles, an Amateur Athletic Union team affiliated with Montverde. Flagg was named the MVP of the 2023 Hoophall Classic after scoring 21 points with 5 steals, 5 rebounds, and 3 assists in Montverde’s 85-63 victory over La Lumiere Academy. He also was named a semifinalist for the Naismith Prep Player of the Year Award.

Recruiting
Flagg was ranked the third-best prospect in the 2025 recruiting class following the conclusion of his freshman season. He re-ranked as the class's second-best recruit in August 2022 following his performance in the 2022 FIBA Under-17 Basketball World Cup. Flagg received his first NCAA Division I scholarship offer from Bryant University while in the eighth grade.

National team
Flagg played for the United States under-17 basketball team at the 2022 FIBA Under-17 Basketball World Cup. He was named to the All-Tournament Team after averaging 9.3 points, 10 rebounds, 2.9 blocked shots, and 2.4 steals per game as the United States won the gold medal. Flagg scored 10 points with 17 rebounds, eight steals, and four blocked shots in a 79-67 win over Spain in the final. He was named the 2022 USA Basketball Male Athlete of the Year for his performance in the Under-17 World Cup and is the youngest player to win the award.

Personal life
Flagg's mother, Kelly, played college basketball at Maine where she was a team captain as a senior. He has a twin brother, Ace, who was a teammate at Nokomis and transferred to Monteverde. Flagg's older brother Hunter was also a Nokomis basketball player and was a senior when he was a freshman.

References

External links
USA Basketball bio

2006 births
Living people
American men's basketball players
Basketball players from Maine
People from Newport, Maine
Small forwards
Montverde Academy alumni